Tangier is a rural community on the Eastern Shore of Nova Scotia, Canada, in the Halifax Regional Municipality. Tangier is situated at the head of Tangier Harbour. The Mi'kmaq name for the settlement was Wospegeak, translating to "the sunshine is reflected from the water". The community is located at the mouth of Tangier River. The present name of the community is most likely derived from the shipwreck of the schooner Tangier in 1830. In 1858, gold was discovered in the area, which sparked gold mining operations in the area for the next 30 years. The community has a church and several private fishing wharfs, as well as a post office.

References

Citations

Bibliography

General Service Areas in Nova Scotia
Communities in Halifax, Nova Scotia